Chilseok is a Korean traditional festival which falls on the seventh day of the seventh month of the Korean lunisolar calendar, originating from the Chinese Qixi Festival. Chilseok is a period where the heat starts to dwindle and the Wet season begins, and the rain that falls during this period is called Chilseok water. As pumpkins, cucumbers, and melons start to flourish during this period, people traditionally offered fried pumpkins to the Big Dipper.

The story of Chilseok
The origin of the tale is a romantic Chinese folk tale, The Cowherd and the Weaver Girl. It was adopted by Koreans. According to the Korean version, a heavenly king had a daughter called Jicknyeo (Hangul: 직녀, Hanja: 織女), who was a talented weaver. One day, when she looked out of the window while weaving, she saw a young man, a herder called Gyeonwoo (Hangul: 견우, Hanja: 牽牛), just across the Milky Way, and fell in love with him; the father allowed the two to marry. Afterwards, Jicknyeo refused to weave clothes, and Gyeonwoo did not take good care of the cows and sheep. The king got very angry, and ordered the couple to live separately, allowing them to meet only once a year. On the seventh day of the seventh month of each year, they were excited to meet each other, but could not cross the Milky Way. However, crows and magpies worked together to form a bridge across the Milky Way for the couple. After a while, their sadness returned, for they were forced to wait another year before meeting again. It is believed crows and magpies have no feathers on their heads because of the couple stepping on their heads. If it rains on that night, it is believed to be the couple's tears.

Chilseok customs 

On Chilseok, Koreans traditionally take baths for good health. In addition, it is traditional to eat wheat flour noodles and grilled wheat cakes. Chilseok is known as the last chance to enjoy wheat-based foods, since the cold winds after Chilseok ruin the scent of wheat. People also used to eat wheat pancakes called miljeonbyeong (밀전병), and sirutteok, a steamed rice cake covered with azuki beans.

Translations 
Orientalist William Elliot Griffis translated the story as The Sky Bridge of Birds, and renamed the characters Weaver Maiden and Cattle Prince.

See also 
 Korean calendar
 Qixi Festival
 Tanabata
 Dumuzid 
 Inanna

References

Further reading

 조산산. "‘선녀결연 설화’의 유형과 전승 양상 - 中․韓 <견우와 직녀>와 <나무꾼과 선녀>를 중심으로" [Study on the Types and Aspects of the Transmission of the Angel-twinning Fairy-tales - In particular on Sino-Korean tales: Niu Lang and Zhi Nu vs. Gyonu and Jingnyo respectively]. In: 비교문학 51 (2010): 91-118. . UCI: G704-000943.2010..51.005
 이상준 [Lee, Sang Joon]. "아동문학에 등장하는 불개와 삽사리의 상징연구" [A Study on the Symbol of Bulgae and Sapsaree in Children’s Literature]. In: 문화와 예술연구 11(2018): 14-46. DOI: 10.35413/culart.2018.11..001

External links
 The Origin and Meaning of the Buddhist Tanabata
 The Etymology of the Star Festival
 Chilseok history
 Customs of Chilseok
 Gyeonu and Jingnyeo

Festivals in Korea
Summer festivals
Food and drink festivals in South Korea
Folk festivals in South Korea
Observances set by the Korean calendar
Summer events in South Korea